Ericodesma scruposa, also known as the Gleichenia ugly nestmaker, is a species of moth of the family Tortricidae. It is found in New Zealand.

Description 
The larva is colour green with a dark head and is between 5 to 8 mm long when mature. The adults of this species have a wingspan is about 21 mm. The forewings are white with bronzy-brown markings. The hindwings are fuscous grey.

Behaviour 
The larva live inside silken webbing around an opening tips of Gleichenia dicarpa.

Host 
The larval host of this species is Gleichenia dicarpa.

References

Moths described in 1924
Archipini
Moths of New Zealand